The Ibaraki dialect (Shinjitai: ,) is a Japanese dialect spoken in Ibaraki Prefecture. It is also noted for its merging of certain vowels, frequent consonant voicing, and a relatively fast rate of speech.

Classification 
Historically, the forms of Japanese spoken in the area that constitutes modern-day Ibaraki were not treated as a unified dialect until the formation of the prefecture in 1871. Conflicting opinions have existed regarding its classification, however. Along with the Tochigi dialect, the Ibaraki dialect is considered a part of the wider North Kantō dialect, with some shared traits with traditional Tokyo dialects. Despite this, several notable similarities with Tōhoku dialects have created debate over this status. Support for a Kantō dialect classification has come from Japanese language experts such as Misao Tōjō and Katsuo Ōhashi, who placed it as part of ‘East Kantō’ and ‘Northwest Kantō’ dialects, respectively. Other experts, such as Tsuneo Tsuzuku and Haruhiko Kindaichi, have supported its classification as a Tōhoku dialect. When assigning Ibaraki to a regional group, Tsuzuku and Kindaichi both added it to nearly identical areas that include Tochigi, Fukushima, southern Iwate, and eastern Yamagata.

Subdivisions

Yoshio Taguchi proposed the following subdivisions in 1939, dividing it into northern, southwest, and southern.

 Northern: Centred around the districts of Taga, Kuji, and Naka. Includes parts of Higashiibaraki and Kashima.
 Southwest: Consists of most of the former Shimōsa Province. Centred around Sashima District and includes Yuki, Kitasōma, and west Makabe.
 Southern: Centred around the districts of Niihari and Inashiki. Includes Namegata, Tsukuba, Nishiibaraki, and the remainder of Makabe.

Phonology 
The Ibaraki dialect is phonetically distinct from standard Japanese and more closely resembles other Kantō and Tōhoku dialects. Among its most characteristic phonetic traits is the tendency for speakers to voice certain syllables that are usually unvoiced in standard Japanese. Specifically, syllables beginning with a k- or t- sound. This means words like byōki ("illness") sound closer to byōgi, and watashi ("I/me") becomes wadashi. Generally, differences in the spoken language are not reflected in the written language, where speakers will write in standard Japanese. Many of these traits are less common in urban areas and parts of the prefecture that are closer to Tokyo, where speakers tend more towards standard Japanese.

Syllable voicing

Voiced syllables 
When occurring within or at the end of a word, syllables beginning with k- ( ka,  ki,  ku,  ke,  ko) and t- ( ta,  chi,  tsu,  te,  to) become voiced. The ka at the end of tosaka ("cockscomb") is voiced to become ga, but the beginning to remains unvoiced to produce tosaga. Similarly, atashi ("I/me") becomes adashi, dekiru ("to be able to") becomes degiru, and kaki ("persimmon") becomes kagi. K- and t-starting syllables in particles and auxiliary verbs are also subject to voicing, i.e., nai kara ("because there is none") becomes nē gara, and zureta no dewanai ka ("it’s slipped out of place") becomes zureda n danē ga. Occasionally, syllables occurring at the start of a word may also be voiced. For example, kaban ("bag") is pronounced as gaban.

In certain situations, voicing does not occur, including:

 When the k- and t-starting syllables come directly after a small-tsu. For example, mikka ("three days") does not become migga, the kke in sokkenaku ("curtly, coldly") remains as kke, and kettei ("decision") is not pronounced as keddei.
For example, kinko ("safe") does not become kingo, and bancha ("coarsely ground tea") does not become banja.
 When the k- and t-starting syllables are part of an onomatopoeic word. For example, pakapaka ("clip clop") and batabata ("noise, commotion") remain the same.

Semi-voiced and unvoiced syllables 
For example, the ji proceeding the ka in sanjikan is not fully voiced, leading to a pronunciation closer to sanchikan. Other examples include mijikai ("short") becoming michikai, hazukashii ("embarrassed") becoming hatsukashii, and zabuton ("cushion") becoming zaputon.

Other than ji, zu, bi, and bu, syllables in certain words may be unvoiced. In a striking reversal of the dialects voicing tendency, the limit-indicating particle dake ("only") is unvoiced in the Ibaraki dialect, becoming take.

Decreased distinction between i and e 
Instead of a clear i or e, a sound somewhere in the middle is pronounced. The word Ibaraki has a clear i sound in standard Japanese but, in the Ibaraki dialect, the beginning i approaches an e sound, sounding closer to ebaraki to non-dialect speakers. Similarly, the i in shokuin ("staff member") changes to sound like shokuen, the standard Japanese pronunciation for "table salt". In contrast, the e in enpitsu ("pencil") is pronounced closer to an i, and sounds more like inpitsu. Pairs like eki ("train station") and iki ("breath") lose most of their distinction. This trait is pronounced enough to occasionally cause speakers to misspell words. This i – e merging is also seen in other Kantō and Tōhoku dialects, and, although widespread across Ibaraki, the trait is experiencing a decline due to decreasing usage among the younger generation.

Vowel merging 
When occurring in succession, certain vowels have their sounds blended and lengthened. These include:

 a + i ( + ) become ē. For example: 
 akai ("red") → akē
 zaimoku ("lumber") → zēmoku.
 Negative verb inflections, ending in the adjective nai ("there isn’t"): nai → nē: shinai ("do not") → shinē.

 a + e ( + ) also become ē. For example:
 a + u ( + ) become ā. For example:
 utau ("to sing") → udā.
 kau ("to buy") → kā.

Pitch accent 
Except for a small area surrounding Kamisu in the southeast tip of the prefecture, the Ibaraki dialect does not have a distinct pitch accent. This differs from standard Japanese and other western Kantō dialects, but is a trait shared with Fukushima, Miyagi and Tochigi dialects. Homophones that are usually distinguished by different pitch accents, such as hashi ("bridge") and hashi ("chopsticks"), are pronounced in a flat, identical tone.

Grammar

Particle usage 
Several particles rarely used in standard Japanese can be found in the Ibaraki dialect.

ppe (っぺ) and be (べ) 

Sentence-ending particles used to express volition, persuasion, or conjecture. Morphological variants of kantō bei and remnants of the literary beshi. Sometimes spoken as long sounds, i.e., bē and ppē.  

 Doushite darō, umai guai ni ikanai na ("This isn’t going so well, I wonder why...") 
→ nandappe, umagu iganē na.
 Kore kara mito ni ikō yo ("Let’s go to Mito") 
→ ima gara mito sa igu be yo.

Although be usually attaches to the end of verbs without triggering inflection, the irregular verb kuru ("to come") can become either kibē or kube when combined with be. Similarly, the irregular verb suru ("to do") conjugates to shibe or sube when be is added. For a stronger expression of emotion than be, -ppe can be added to the stem form. For example, kiru be ("I will cut it") is less emotive than kippe ("I will cut it"), which implies a stronger sense of volition.

 Kami o hasami de kirō ("I’m going to cut some paper") 
→ Kami o hasami de kippe.
 Dō shiyō ("what shall [I] do?") 
→ dō sube or dō suppe.
 Kaita darō ("I wrote it, didn’t I?") 
→ kaita be or kaitappe.

sa (さ) 
Case-marking particle used to denote direction. Used in other parts of Kantō and Tōhoku.

 Mito he itte kita ("I went to Mito") 
→ Mito sa itte kita.

ke (け): recollection 
Sentence-ending particle used to express recollection or reminiscence.

 Sō da, ano toki wa ame ga futte ita naa ("It rained then, didn’t it...") 
→ Nda, antoki wa ame futtekkena.

ke (け) and ge (げ): inquiry 
Sentence-ending particle used to indicate a question. Compared to ka, ke tends to show more intimacy with the listener as well as being politer.

 Sore wa hontō na no ka? ("Is that really true?")
→ Sore wa hontō na no ke / ge?.
 Sō na no kai ("I see")
→sokke or sōge.

Speakers also tend to omit some particles in conversation.

 Ame ga futte iru ("It’s raining") 
→ Ame futteru.
 Mizu o nomu ("I drink water") 
→ Mizu nomu.

Verb conjugation 
The past-tense standard form of the auxiliary verb shimau, shimatta, becomes chitta in the Ibaraki dialect. For example, yonde shimatta ("I read it" (expressing regret)) becomes yonchitta.  Words with the prefix bu-, usually used to indicate forceful emphasis (e.g., bukkowasu , "to completely destroy"), are sometimes merged with the verb to which they are attached (i.e., bukkowasu  → bukkasu ), and then lose their original meaning.

Inflection of the irregular verb kuru (来る)

Polite speech 
Polite speech is not generally used, especially towards third parties. Passive-form auxiliary verbs used to show politeness such as reru, rareru, serareru, and saserareru are rarely used, i.e., sensei ga korareru ("teacher comes" (polite)) is simply said as sensei ga kuru ("teacher comes"). Polite verbs such as nasaru ("to do"), ni naru ("to become, to be"), and kudasaru (used for polite requests) are used, but often have different spoken forms, as shown in the following examples:

 O-machi kudasai (mase) ("please wait"). 
→ Matte-kunro or matte-kuncho.
 O-tomari kudasai (mase) ("please stay"). 
→ Tomari-na or otomannansho.
 O-agari kudasai (mase) ("please eat"). 
→ Agarassho or agarasse.
 Mite kudasai (mase) ("please look").
→ Mina, minasse, or mirassho.
 Arukinasai (mase) ("walk" (command)). 
→ Arukasse.

Notable words and phrases 

 nandappe (roughly "what is it?"). Rough equivalent with nandarō in standard Japanese.
 suppe ("let's do it"). Rough equivalent with shiyō.
 iku be ("let's go"). Equivalent with ikō.
 gojappe (roughly "nonsense"). Similar to detarame in standard Japanese.
 deresuke ("sloppy, careless man"). No exact equivalent in standard Japanese.
 ijiyakeru (used to show frustration or anger).

References 

Japanese dialects
Culture in Ibaraki Prefecture